Stephen Huss (born 10 December 1975) is a former professional tennis player from Australia.

Along with partner Wesley Moodie, he became the first qualifier to win the Wimbledon men's doubles championship in 2005, beating the 6th, 9th, 3rd, 1st & 2nd seeds in the process. His Wimbledon title was only his second doubles title on the ATP tour after his 2002 success at Casablanca with Myles Wakefield.

Huss played tennis collegiately at Auburn University in the United States from 1996 to 2000, where he was an All-American in doubles in 1998 and in singles in 2000. Huss played in the NCAA Tournament in both of those years for the Tigers. An All-SEC selection in 1998, he was the 1999 National Clay Court Champion along with partner Tiago Ruffoni. His 93 career doubles victories is an Auburn record.

His grand slam success saw him soar from 101st to 32nd place in the ATP Doubles ranking. He reached a career high 21st place in June 2006.

Huss retired from professional tennis after the 2011 US Open.

He currently resides in Atlanta, Georgia, USA, with his wife, former professional tennis player Milagros Sequera, whom he married in Australia on 29 December 2009. They have two kids Noah and Kensi. He currently coaches several junior and college tennis players.

In June 2012, Huss accepted an assistant coaching position with Virginia Tech Men's Tennis under head coach Jim Thompson. Under Thompson, Huss and the Hokies experienced great success including a school high ranking of 14 and developing Joao Monteiro who reached top 250 in the world.

He now is a United States Tennis Association National team coach where he is working with top female players.

Grand Slam finals

Doubles: 1 (1–0)

ATP Career Finals

Doubles: 12 (4 titles, 8 runner-ups)

ATP Challenger and ITF Futures finals

Doubles: 39 (26–13)

Performance timelines

Doubles

Mixed doubles

References

External links
 
 
 

1975 births
Living people
Auburn Tigers men's tennis players
Auburn Tigers men's tennis coaches
Australian expatriate sportspeople in the United States
Australian male tennis players
Australian people of Swedish descent
Sportspeople from Bendigo
Swedish people of Australian descent
Wimbledon champions
Grand Slam (tennis) champions in men's doubles
Tennis people from Victoria (Australia)
Australian tennis coaches
21st-century Australian people